Sardar Ameer Buksh Khan Bhutto is President of the Pakistan Tehreek-e-Insaf Sindh and an ex-Member of the Sindh Assembly. He is the son of Sardar Mumtaz Bhutto.
 and after the death of Sardar Mumtaz Bhutto, he was elected as Chief Sardar of Bhutto tribe of Sindh.

He holds a Bachelor of Arts degree in Politics, Economics & Law from the University of Buckingham and a Master of Philosophy degree in International Relations from Cambridge University. He wrote a thesis titled "Of Knights and Harlots: The Role of the Superpowers in the 1971 Indo-Pakistan War." He has also written dozens of articles published in English and Sindhi newspapers and magazines in Pakistan.

He ran for the seat of the Provincial Assembly of Sindh twice, in 2002 general election and again in 2008 election but was defeated twice by Muhammad Ayaz Soomro.

On 10 November 2017, Ameer Buksh Khan Bhutto while meeting with Shah Mehmood Qureishi, announced he was joining Pakistan Tehreek-e-Insaf.

See also
 Bhutto
 Bhutto family

References

1954 births
Living people
Sindhi people
Ameer Bux
Pakistani democracy activists
Alumni of the University of Buckingham
Pakistani lawyers